(born August 10) is a Japanese manga artist. She debuted in 1990 in the 17th issue of the manga anthology magazine Sho-Comi with the series SP girl. She still writes primarily for Sho-Comi, with her serialized works also published in collected volumes by Shogakukan, the company that publishes Sho-Comi.

List of works
 (1990) 
 (1992) 
 (1993) 
 (1993) 
 (1994) 
 (1994) 
 (1996) 
 (1998) ; English translation: Wild Act (2003)
 (2000) 
 (2001) 
 (2003) ; English translation: Happy Hustle High (2005)
 (2005) ; English translation: Punch! (2006)
 (2005) 
 (2006) 
 (2007) 
 (2007) ; English translation: Gaba Kawa (2008)
 (2008)  
 (2009) 
 (2009) 
 (2011) 
 (2013)

References

External links
 Official Sho-Comi artist's profile
 

Living people
Year of birth missing (living people)
Manga artists